Reclining Figure: External Form 1953–54 is a bronze sculpture by Henry Moore, catalogued as LH 299. It is approximately 2.1 m long. Casts are owned by Vermögen und Bau, Baden-Württemberg; the National Gallery of Modern Art, Rome; and the National Museum of Fine Arts, Buenos Aires.

See also
List of sculptures by Henry Moore

References

External links

1954 sculptures
Collections of the Israel Museum
Sculptures by Henry Moore